Fomitella is a genus of fungi in the family Fomitopsidaceae. The genus was described in 1905 by American mycologist William Alphonso Murrill with F. supina as the type species.

References

Fomitopsidaceae
Polyporales genera
Taxa named by William Alphonso Murrill
Taxa described in 1905